There are at least 10 named lakes and reservoirs in Van Buren County, Arkansas.

Lakes
According to the United States Geological Survey, there are no named lakes in Van Buren County, Arkansas.

Reservoirs
B B Ranch Lake, el.  
Brock Creek Lake, el.  
Brock Creek Lake, el.  
Choctaw Lake, el.  
Clinton Lake, el.  
Driver Creek Lake, el.  
East Fork Point Remove Site One Reservoir, el.  
East Fork Point Remove Site Two Reservoir, el.  
Jackson Lake, el.  
West Fork Point Remove Creek Site One Reservoir, el.

See also
 List of lakes in Arkansas

Notes

Bodies of water of Van Buren County, Arkansas
Van Buren